Siiri is an Estonian and Finnish feminine given name derived from the Old Norse name Sigríðr. It is a cognate of the modern Scandinavian name Sigrid.   

People named Siiri include:
Siiri Angerkoski (1902–1971), Finnish actress
Siiri Oviir (born 1947), Estonian politician
Siiri Nordin (born 1980), Finnish singer
Siiri Rantanen (born 1924), Finnish cross-country skier
Siiri Sisask (born 1968), Estonian singer, actress and politician
Siiri Välimaa (born 1990), Finnish footballer 
Siiri Vallner (born 1972), Estonian architect

References

Estonian feminine given names
Finnish feminine given names